Cacotemnus is a genus of beetles belonging to the family Ptinidae. The species of this genus are found in Europe and North America.

Species
Two species are recognised in the genus Cacotemnus: 
 Cacotemnus rufipes
 Cacotemnus thomsoni

References

Ptinidae